Robert Wolveden (died 1432) was a Canon of Windsor from 1407 to 1412 and Dean of Lichfield.

Career
He was appointed:
Prebendary of York 1401
Prebendary of Southwell 1405
Archdeacon of Norwich 1406
Dean of Lichfield 1426 - 1432

He was appointed to the first stall in St George's Chapel, Windsor Castle in 1407, and held the stall until 1412 when he exchanged it for the Deanery of Tetenhale.

Notes 

1432 deaths
Canons of Windsor
Archdeacons of Norwich
Deans of Lichfield
Year of birth missing